Ward Village is a , master-planned community in the Kaka'ako district of Honolulu. It is being developed by The Howard Hughes Corporation. Once completed, this beachfront development will have luxury residences, retail stores, entertainment venues, pedestrian friendly streets and public open space.

The Development Process 
Over the course of the next decade, The Howard Hughes Corporation plans to add more than one million square feet of retail shops and 4,000 high-rise residential opportunities. To ensure the development of Ward Village honors the distinct history of Honolulu and Hawaii, The Howard Hughes Corporation engages in thorough and ongoing consultation with the O'ahu Island Burial Counsel, the State Historic Preservation Division, the Office of Hawaiian Affairs, the Ala Moana/Kaka'ako Neighborhood Board, the Hawaii Community Development Authority, the City and County of Honolulu, tenants, neighbors and recognized cultural descendants.

Phase One Development 

Phase One of the project featured the development of two residential condominium towers—Waiea and Anaha—as well as a new master plan information center and residential sales gallery in the IBM Building.
The towers were completed in 2017.

Waiea 
Waiea features 171 residences, including 10 villas and 10 penthouses. The tower is designed by James K.M. Cheng and Hawaii-based Rob Iopa of WCIT Architecture. The interiors of Waiea are created by interior designer, Tony Ingrao and the landscaping is designed by SWA Group.
Waiea features Nobu's

Anaha 
The Anaha tower includes 311 residences, including 73 flats and townhomes. Anaha is collaboratively designed by architecture and design firms Solomon Cordwell Buenz and Ben Woo Architects. The interiors are designed by designer Woods Bagot and the exterior spaces are created by landscape designer Surface Design of San Francisco.
Merriman's restaurant will open its first Oahu restaurant at Anaha in Summer 2018.

IBM Building 

In 2008, a redevelopment plan slated the IBM Building for demolition, but public backlash led to its preservation instead. The building was renovated and repurposed by Woods Bagot to be a sales center for Howard Hughes Corporation, as part of the development company's master plan for the surrounding Ward Village development, officially reopening in 2014. Howard Hughes built model units in the building for several of their nearby condominiums, and also utilized it as office space; it occupied the second, third, sixth and seventh floors while maintaining an information center on the first.

Phase Two Development 

Phase two of the project includes the Ae'o tower, Ke Kilohana, and A'ali'i.

Ae'o 
Ae'o is designed by Bohlin Cywinski Jackson, and will include 466 residences. Expected completion is late 2018. A new flagship Whole Foods Market will anchor the building.

Ke Kilohana 
Ke Kilohana is designed AC Martin in partnership with Honolulu based CDS International. There are 424 residences, 375 of which were reserved for qualified Hawaii residents. Purchase opportunities were made available via lottery, which sold out in five days. As of 2018 the tower remains under construction. A Longs Drugs store will anchor the building.

A'ali'i 
Unlike the more luxury focused developments of Ward Village, A'ali'i is largely affordable micro-units, 751 in total.

Phase Three Development 

The centerpiece of Ward Village is to be the Gateway Towers. The 1970s Ward Warehouse was torn down in late 2017 to begin clearing space.
The Ward Farmer's market was shut down in 2017, and will be demolished to make way for a public park. Additional real estate owned by Howard Hughes has been considered for future parks and parking lots.

Gateway Towers 
Gateway Towers is designed by the firm of Richard Meier, and will feature 236 units. These will be the most luxurious homes in the neighborhood, and feature unique considerations such as a bridge linking the two towers.

LEED Certification 
Ward Village is a LEED-ND Platinum-Certified project. It is the largest development in the United States and the second largest in the world to receive this recognition. It is the only LEED-ND Platinum-Certified project in Hawaii. The design of Ward Village incorporates the highest standards of growth and environmental sustainability.

External links
 Ward Village
 The Howard Hughes Corporation

References 

Neighborhoods in Honolulu